This article lists the results and fixtures for the Myanmar women's national football team.

Results and upcoming fixtures

2014

2015

2016

2017

2018

2019

2020

References

Women's sport in Myanmar